New Zealand is a nation that has competed at the Hopman Cup tournament on one occasion, at the 2nd annual staging of the tournament in 1990, when they lost to Austria in the first round.

Players
This is a list of players who have played for New Zealand in the Hopman Cup.

Results

References

Hopman Cup teams
Hopman Cup
Hopman Cup